Gian Matteo Fanini is a former Italian professional cyclist who was born on 11 October 1970 in Lecco, Italy. He is best known for winning the Intergiro classification at the 1998 Giro d'Italia and along with winning two stages at the Giro.

Major results

1991
2nd GP Capodarco
1993
1st Stage 2 GP Tell
1994
1st Stage 2 Euskal Bizikleta
1995
9th Wincanton Classic
1996
7th Clásica de Almería
1997
1st Stage 5a Volta a la Comunitat Valenciana
1998
Giro d'Italia
1st  Intergiro classification
1st Stages 20 & 22
1999
8th Amstel Gold Race
2000
5th Scheldeprijs
2001
1st Rund um Köln
2003
1st Stage 2 Vuelta a Asturias

References

1970 births
Living people
Italian Giro d'Italia stage winners
Italian male cyclists
Sportspeople from Lecco
Cyclists from the Province of Lecco